Rubin Thayer Rivers Jr. (born January 7, 1947) is a former American politician in the state of South Carolina. He served in the South Carolina House of Representatives from 2001 to 2006 from the 122nd district. He is a lawyer.

References

1947 births
Living people
People from Ridgeland, South Carolina
South Carolina lawyers
Democratic Party members of the South Carolina House of Representatives